Harmston is a village and civil parish in the North Kesteven district of Lincolnshire, England.

Harmston may also refer to:

Places
 Harmston railway station, a station in Harmston, Lincolnshire
 Mount Harmston, a mountain on Vancouver Island, British Columbia, Canada

People
 James D. Harmston, the founder of the True and Living Church of Jesus Christ of Saints of the Last Days
 Tim Harmston, a stand-up comedian

Other
 Harmstonia, a genus of flies